Dhaka International University or DIU is a non-government institution in Dhaka, Bangladesh. The university was established on 7 April 1995 by the Private University Act 1992. The founder of DIU is A.B.M Mafizul Islam Patwari and the vice-chancellor is Professor Dr. Saiful Islam.

History 
The initial planning began in 1994 but the university was established in 1995. In fact, DIU takes the initiative strongly for the creation of non-government universities and supports the initiative of the Government of Bangladesh. It is now operated as a government-approved university under the Non-Government University Acts of 1992 and 1998.

It is operated as a non-profitable institution and offers strict academic disciplines. The late A.B.M Mafizul Islam Patwari is recognized by the Government of Bangladesh as the founder of the university.

List of vice-chancellors 
 Professor Dr. Saiful Islam ( present )

Academic session
The academic year of some degrees of DIU comprises two semesters. Each semester consists of 26 weeks.
 Winter semester: January–June
 Summer semester: July–December
& the academic year of some degrees of DIU comprises three semesters. Each semester consists of four months.
 Spring semester: January to April
 Summer semester: May to August
 Fall semester: September to December

Departments
 Department of Computer Science and Engineering (CSE)
 Department of Electrical and Electronic Engineering (EETE)
 Department of Civil Engineering
 Department of Business Administration
 Department of Law
 Department of Pharmacy
 Department of English
 Department of Sociology
 Department of Economics
 Department of Political Science

Laboratory Facilities
 The Faculty of Science and Engineering has got very excellent laboratory facilities.
 The Electrical and Electronic Engineering (EEE) department has been enriched with superb laboratory facilities.
 The Pharmacy department has been enriched with modern laboratory facilities.

Research Cell
 Tobacco Control & Research Cell (TCRC): Tobacco Control & Research Cell is a research and advocacy cell of the university which is continuously working on anti-tobacco-related issues and promoting the values of the anti-tobacco movement.
 Social Business Academic Cell (SBAC):  Social Business Academic Cell is a research center of the university which is continuously working on new social business ideas. Social business is a new type of business introduced by Nobel Peace Prize Winner Muhammad Yunus.

Hostel
DIU offers a well-decorated hostel with modern facilities. At present, there are seven boy hostels (Nikunja, Khilkhet, Satarkul, Badda) and two girl hostels (Green Road & Satarkul).

References

 DIU
Educational institutions established in 1995
Private universities in Bangladesh
Universities and colleges in Dhaka
1995 establishments in Bangladesh